The 2009 Special Olympics Great Britain National Games were held in Leicester between the 25 and 31 July 2009.

Athletes and volunteers
Over 2,400 athletes representing 19 Special Olympics regions across the UK have visited the city of Leicester over the seven-day period along with 1,200 coaches and 1,500 volunteers.

2,422 athletes competed in 21 Olympic style competitions across the city. The city of Leicester have also recruited about 1,500 volunteers to participate in the Games.

Leicester's landscape has changed dramatically since the city first hosted the Games in 1989. From the rich diversity of its population, to the magnificent ongoing 3 billion regeneration programme, Leicester was a city rising to the challenge on many fronts.

A host of celebrities have already offered up their support to the Games next year including Martin Johnson, Gary Lineker, Leicester Tigers, Leicester City FC, and Leicestershire CCC.

Venues
Walkers Stadium, home of Leicester City Football Club, was used for the Opening Ceremony and the Games Village. Sailing was held at Rutland Sailing Centre and Kayaking have taken place at the Anglian Water Site. Leicestershire County Cricket Club were used for Kwik Cricket. Other venues included Abbey Park (cycling), Braunestone Leisure Centre (swimming), New College Leicester (gymnastics), Hollywood Bowl (ten pin bowling), Saffron Lane Sports Centre (athletics) and Soar Valley College (netball).

The full list of competition venues was as follows:

Sports

The following competitions took place:

See also
 Special Olympics Great Britain

References

External links
 Special Olympics GB Leicester 2009 -  Archived Official Website
 Special Olympics Great Britain
 Voluntary Action Leicester

Special Olympics
Organisations based in Leicestershire
Sport in Leicester
Multi-sport events in the United Kingdom
2009 in multi-sport events
2009 in British sport
2009 in England
2000s in Leicestershire